Bobby, the Petrol Boy is a 1929 German silent drama film directed by Carl Boese and starring Gustav Rickelt, Sophie Pagay, and Ruth Weyher. It was shot at the National Studios in Berlin. The film's sets were designed by the art director Otto Moldenhauer. It was distributed by the German branch of First National Pictures.

Cast

References

Bibliography

External links

1929 films
Films of the Weimar Republic
Films directed by Carl Boese
German silent feature films
German black-and-white films
Films about children
1929 drama films
German drama films
1920s German films